Kentucky's 13th congressional district was a district of the United States House of Representatives in Kentucky. It was lost to redistricting in 1843. Its last Representative was William O. Butler.

List of members representing the district

References

 Congressional Biographical Directory of the United States 1774–present

13
Former congressional districts of the United States
Constituencies established in 1833
1833 establishments in Kentucky
Constituencies disestablished in 1843
1843 disestablishments in Kentucky